Steen Smidt-Jensen (born 26 January 1945) is a Danish athlete. He competed in the men's decathlon at the 1968 Summer Olympics and the 1972 Summer Olympics.

References

1945 births
Living people
Athletes (track and field) at the 1968 Summer Olympics
Athletes (track and field) at the 1972 Summer Olympics
Danish decathletes
Olympic athletes of Denmark
Athletes from Copenhagen